The 2015–16 season was Tottenham Hotspur's 24th season in the Premier League and 38th successive season in the top division of the English football league system. Along with the Premier League, the club competed in the FA Cup, League Cup and the Europa League. The season covers the period from 1 July 2015 to 30 June 2016.

Squad

First-team squad
Age listed below are accurate as of 15 May 2016
{| class="wikitable" style="text-align:center;width:80%"
|-
! style="background:#00f; color:white; text-align:center;"| Squad no.
! style="background:#00f; color:white; text-align:center;"| Name
! style="background:#00f; color:white; text-align:center;"| Nationality
! style="background:#00f; color:white; text-align:center;"| Position(s)
! style="background:#00f; color:white; text-align:center;"| Date of birth (age)
|-
! colspan="5" style="background:#dcdcdc; text-align:center;"| Goalkeepers
|-
| 1
| Hugo Lloris (C)
| 
| GK
| 
|-
| 13
| Michel Vorm
| 
| GK
| 
|-
| 31
| Luke McGee U21
| 
| GK
| 
|-
! colspan="5" style="background:#dcdcdc; text-align:center;"| Defenders
|-
| 2
| Kyle Walker HG1
| 
| RB / RWB
| 
|-
| 3
| Danny Rose HG2
| 
| LB / LWB
| 
|-
| 4
| Toby Alderweireld
| 
| CB / RB
| 
|-
| 5
| Jan Vertonghen (1st VC)| 
| CB / LB
| 
|-
| 16
| Kieran Trippier HG1
| 
| RB / RWB
| 
|-
| 27
| Kevin Wimmer
| 
| CB / LB
| 
|-
| 33
| Ben Davies HG1
| 
| LB / CB
| 
|-
! colspan="5" style="background:#dcdcdc; text-align:center;"| Midfielders
|-
| 6
| Nabil Bentaleb U21
| 
| CM / DM
| 
|-
| 8
| Ryan Mason HG2
| 
| CM / AM
| 
|-
| 11
| Erik Lamela
| 
| RW / SS
| 
|-
| 15
| Eric Dier  U21
| 
| DM / CB
| 
|-
| 19
| Mousa Dembélé
| 
| CM / AM
| 
|-
| 20
| Dele Alli U21
| 
| CM / AM
| 
|-
| 22
| Nacer Chadli
| 
| LW / SS
| 
|-
| 23
| Christian Eriksen
| 
| AM / CM
| 
|-
| 25
| Josh Onomah U21
| 
| AM / SS
| 
|-
| 28
| Tom Carroll HG2
| 
| CM / AM
| 
|-
| 29
| Harry Winks U21
| 
| CM / DM
| 
|-
! colspan="12" style="background:#dcdcdc; text-align:center;"| Forwards
|-
| 7
| Son Heung-min
| 
| FW / LW / RW / SS
| 
|-
| 10
| Harry Kane (2nd VC)| 
| FW / SS
| 
|-
| 14
| Clinton N'Jie
| 
| FW / RW
| 
|-
|}
 HG1 = Association-trained player
 HG2 = Club-trained player
 U21 = Under 21 players (Contract and Scholars)

Transfers
Loans out

Transfers in

Total outgoing: £49,600,000+ 

Transfers out

Total incoming:  £62,100,000+

Overall transfer activity

Spending
Summer:  £49,600,000

Winter:  £0+

Total:  £49,600,000+

Income
Summer:  £49,600,000

Winter:  £12,500,000+

Total:  £62,100,000+

Expenditure
Summer:  £0

Winter:  £12,500,000

Total:  £12,500,000

Friendlies
Pre-season

Competitions

Overall

Overview

{| class="wikitable" style="text-align: center"
|-
!rowspan=2|Competition
!colspan=8|Record
|-
!
!
!
!
!
!
!
!
|-
| Premier League

|-
| FA Cup

|-
| League Cup

|-
| Europa League

|-
! Total

Premier League

League table

Results summary

Results by matchday

Matches
On 17 June 2015, the fixtures for the forthcoming season were announced.

FA Cup

The third round draw was held on 7 December 2015. Spurs were drawn at home to Leicester City.
The draw for the fourth round proper was held on 11 January 2016 and Tottenham were drawn away at Colchester United.

League Cup

The third round draw was made on 25 August 2015 live on Sky Sports by Charlie Nicholas and Phil Thompson. Spurs were drawn at home against Arsenal.

UEFA Europa League

Group stage

On 28 August 2015, the draw for the group stage was made in Monaco. Spurs faced Anderlecht, Monaco and Qarabağ in Group J. Spurs topped the group with thirteen points, and were drawn against Serie A side Fiorentina in the Round of 32.

Knockout phase

Round of 32

Round of 16

Statistics

Appearances

Goal scorersThe list is sorted by squad number when total goals are equal. Hat-tricks 

Own goals

Clean sheetsThe list is sorted by squad number when total clean sheets are equal.''

References

Tottenham Hotspur
Tottenham Hotspur F.C. seasons